Universal Health Services, Inc. v. United States ex rel. Escobar, 579 U.S. ___ (2016), was a United States Supreme Court case in which the Court held that "the implied false certification theory can be a basis for False Claims Act liability when a defendant submitting a claim makes specific representations about the goods or services provided, but fails to disclose noncompliance with material statutory, regulatory, or contractual requirements that make those representations misleading with respect to those goods or services."

Opinion of the Court 
Associate Justice Clarence Thomas authored a unanimous opinion.

References

External links
 
 SCOTUSblog coverage

United States Supreme Court cases
United States Supreme Court cases of the Roberts Court
2016 in United States case law